The National Nurses Association (also known as the Association of Nurses) was a trades union for British nurses founded by Thora Silverthorne and Nancy Zinkin in 1937.

It organised a campaign to highlight the poor pay and conditions of nurses with a protest march of 1000 nurses. Silverthorne was attacked by the Royal College of Nursing for “not being a registered nurse” or being “paid by Moscow”.  The Association later joined the National Union of Public Employees.

References

Defunct trade unions of the United Kingdom
Trade unions established in 1937
1937 establishments in the United Kingdom
Nursing organisations in the United Kingdom